William Emery (25 August 1897 – 13 December 1962) was a Welsh cricketer.  Emery was a right-handed batsman who bowled right-arm medium pace. He was born at Pentrebach, Glamorgan.

Emery represented Glamorgan in 2 first-class in 1922 against Lancashire and Nottinghamshire.  In 1925, he represented Wales in a single first-class match against the Marylebone Cricket Club at Lord's.

Emery died at Gowerton, Glamorgan on 13 December 1962.

References

External links 
 
 Bill Emery at CricketArchive

1897 births
1962 deaths
Sportspeople from Merthyr Tydfil
Welsh cricketers
Glamorgan cricketers
Wales cricketers